Murry Linn Bartow (born August 18, 1961) is an American college basketball coach who most recently was the interim head coach for the UCLA Bruins. As the head coach of the East Tennessee State Buccaneers, he was twice named the conference coach of the year, first in the Southern Conference in 2004 and later in the Atlantic Sun Conference in 2007.

Career

UAB
Bartow served as the head coach for his alma mater University of Alabama at Birmingham (UAB) from 1996 to 2002, succeeding his father Gene, the creator of the UAB Blazers men's basketball program. At UAB, he compiled a 103–83 overall record with a conference mark of 48–46 and one NCAA Tournament appearance.

East Tennessee State
Bartow was the men's head basketball coach at East Tennessee State University (ETSU) from 2003 to 2015. Bartow's first season at ETSU brought division and conference regular season titles and the Southern Conference (SoCon) Tournament championship.  The team finished 27–6 (15–1 conference) and ended their season in an 80–77 NCAA tournament opening round loss to Cincinnati.  Bartow was named the SoCon Coach of the Year.

Bartow led the Buccaneers to the regular season Atlantic Sun Conference title in 2006–07 with a 24–10 overall record, despite the graduation of three starters.  Bartow was named Atlantic Sun Coach of the Year. The Buccaneers earned NCAA tournament appearances for winning A-Sun Conference tournament championships in the 2008–09 and 2009–10 seasons.

Overall, Bartow led the Bucs to three NCAA appearances in his tenure at ETSU.  After a change in the school president and athletic director, Bartow was released at the end of 2015.

University of South Florida
Bartow was hired as an assistant coach at the University of South Florida (USF) in August 2016.

He was named interim head coach on January 3, 2017 following the firing of head coach Orlando Antigua. Bartow led the team to a 1–16 record during his time as interim head coach.

UCLA
In April 2018, Bartow was hired by UCLA head coach Steve Alford as an assistant coach to replace the fired David Grace. On December 31, 2018, Bartow was named the interim head coach after Alford was fired in the middle of the 2018–19 season. The Bruins had begun the season 4–0 and ranked No. 17 in the AP Poll, but they lost six of the next nine and finished with a 7–6 record in nonconference play, closing it out with four straight losses. Under Bartow, UCLA opened conference play 2–0 at home against San Francisco Bay Area schools Stanford and California. Emphasizing the team's speed and athleticism, he had the Bruins play more aggressive, trapping and applying pressure on defense and attacking on offense by running on both missed and made baskets. Six Bruins scored in double figures against Cal after five reached the threshold against the Cardinal. In their 13 non-conference games under Alford, UCLA never had more than four double-figure scorers.

Bartow compiled a 10–10 record as interim head coach at UCLA, including a 9–9 record in regular season Pac-12 games. The Bruins defeated Stanford in the first round of the Pac-12 tournament before losing to Arizona State in the quarterfinals. Afterwards, Bartow stated that he was not interested in having his interim tag removed, and expressed optimism that UCLA would "hire a very good coach".

Personal life
Born in Warrensburg, Missouri, Bartow holds a B.A. from UAB and a master's degree from Indiana University. He is married to his wife Tammy (née Earley), and they have 3 children together.

His father, Gene, was a Hall of Fame college basketball coach, coaching UCLA and UAB, among other schools.

Head coaching record

References

External links
 East Tennessee State profile

1961 births
Living people
American men's basketball coaches
American men's basketball players
Basketball coaches from Missouri
Basketball players from Missouri
Basketball players from Birmingham, Alabama
College men's basketball head coaches in the United States
East Tennessee State Buccaneers men's basketball coaches
Indiana Hoosiers men's basketball coaches
People from Warrensburg, Missouri
Sportspeople from Birmingham, Alabama
Truman State University alumni
UAB Blazers men's basketball coaches
UAB Blazers men's basketball players
UCLA Bruins men's basketball coaches
William & Mary Tribe men's basketball coaches